The 2016 MTN 8 was the 42nd edition of South Africa's annual soccer cup competition, the MTN 8. It featured the top eight teams of the Premier Soccer League at the end of the 2015-16 season.

Teams
The eight teams that competed in the MTN 8 knockout competition are (listed according to their finishing position in the 2015/2016 Premier Soccer League Season):
 1. Mamelodi Sundowns
 2. Bidvest Wits
 3. Platinum Stars
 4. Cape Town City
 5. Kaizer Chiefs
 6. Chippa United
 7. Orlando Pirates
 8. SuperSport United

Results

Quarter-finals

Semi-finals

1st Leg

2nd Leg

Final

References

MTN 8
2016–17 in South African soccer
2016 domestic association football cups